German submarine U-326 was a Type VIIC/41 U-boat of Nazi Germany's Kriegsmarine during World War II. While she carried out one patrol U-326 failed to sink or damage any ships. The boat was sunk on 30 April 1945 in the Bay of Biscay by an American aircraft.

Design
German Type VIIC/41 submarines were preceded by the heavier Type VIIC submarines. U-326 had a displacement of  when at the surface and  while submerged. She had two shafts and two  propellers.

U-326 was fitted with five  torpedo tubes (four fitted at the bow and one at the stern), fourteen torpedoes, one  SK C/35 naval gun, (220 rounds), one  Flak M42 and two  C/30 anti-aircraft guns. The boat had a complement of between forty-four and sixty.

Service history

The submarine was laid down on 26 April 1943 by the Flender Werke yard at Lübeck as yard number 326, launched on 22 April 1944 and commissioned on 6 June under the command of Kapitänleutnant Peter Matthes.

She served with the 4th U-boat Flotilla for training, from 6 June 1944 to 28 February 1945. She was then transferred to the 11th flotilla for operations on 1 March.

Patrol
Having carried out a series of short voyages between Kiel in Germany and Horten Naval Base, Stavanger and Bergen in Norway in February and March 1945, U-326 departed Bergen on 28 March and passing western Scotland and Ireland, entered the Bay of Biscay.

Fate
The boat was sunk by a retro bombs dropped from a US Navy PBY Catalina of VP-63 west of Brest on 30 April 1945.

Forty-three men died; there were no survivors.

See also
 Battle of the Atlantic (1939-1945)

References

Bibliography

External links

German Type VIIC/41 submarines
U-boats commissioned in 1944
1944 ships
World War II submarines of Germany
World War II shipwrecks in the Atlantic Ocean
Ships built in Lübeck
U-boats sunk by US aircraft
Ships lost with all hands
U-boats sunk in 1945
Maritime incidents in April 1945